Carphochaete gummifera is a species of Mexican  flowering plants in the family Asteraceae. They are native to Zacatecas in north-central Mexico.

References

Eupatorieae
Flora of Zacatecas
Plants described in 1942